Inside Edge is an Indian sports-drama streaming television series created by Karan Anshuman and released on Amazon Prime Video. It premiered on 10 July 2017, and is the first Hindi-language series distributed by Amazon Originals. The series centers on the Mumbai Mavericks, a fictional T20 cricket team, whose owners operate a league-wide spot-fixing syndicate. Inside Edge stars an ensemble cast, featuring Vivek Oberoi, Richa Chada, Siddhant Chaturvedi, Tanuj Virwani, Angad Bedi, Sayani Gupta, Aamir Bashir, and Sapna Pabbi, as well as Manu Rishi, Amit Sial, Karan Oberoi, and Asha Saini.

Inside Edge has received positive critical reception and was nominated for Best Drama series at 46th International Emmy Awards. The second season premiered on 6 December 2019. The show was also been renewed for a third season that premiered on 3 December 2021.

Plot

Season 1 
Inside Edge is the story of the Mumbai Mavericks, a T20 cricket franchise playing in the Powerplay League. Set in a landscape of conflicting interests, where selfishness is almost a virtue, where money and power go hand in hand, the series traces the ups and downs in the Powerplay league as the Mumbai Mavericks face ownership problems along with accusations of match fixing.

Season 2 
In the next edition of the PPL, a volatile Vayu Raghavan leads the Mumbai Mavericks to face their biggest adversary yet, the Arvind Vashisht-led Haryana Hurricanes. But they must also counter colossal scandals that’ll rock the world of cricket. In the sport’s upper echelons, Zarina Malik allies with Bhaisaab, but those in the shadows threaten to destroy the very game they seek to control.

Season 3 
In the third season, the series moves on towards international cricket, with Vayu competing against Indian captain Rohit. Meanwhile, Dhawan swears revenge on Bhaisaab, and uses his alliance with Zarina to accomplish it.

Cast

Main
 Vivek Oberoi as Vikrant Dhawan, the owner of one of the world's leading sports management companies. (Season 1-present)
 Richa Chadda as Zarina Malik, a fading actress and co-owner of the Mumbai Mavericks. (Season 1–present)
 Tanuj Virwani as Vayu Raghavan, the moody, hothead star player and later captain of the Mavericks, and Mantra's boyfriend. (Season 1–present)
 Siddhant Chaturvedi as Prashant Kanaujia, a rookie fast bowler who joins the Mavericks, and befriends Vayu. (Season 1–2)
 Angad Bedi as Arvind Vashishth, an ex-international player and the captain of the Mavericks, who later becomes captain of the Haryana Hurricanes. (Season 1–2)
 Sayani Gupta as Rohini Raghavan, Vayu's sister and the chief analyst of the Mavericks, and later, the Hurricanes and Indian Team. (Season 1–present)
 Aamir Bashir as Yashvardhan Patil/Bhaisahab, the President of Indian Cricket Board and the founder of the PowerPlay League. (Season 2–3)
 Sapna Pabbi as Mantra Patil, co-owner of Mumbai Mavericks, Yashvardhan's daughter, and Vayu's girlfriend. (Season 2–present)
 Akshay Oberoi as Rohit Shanbagh, captain of Indian Cricket Team. (Season 3–present)
 Sidhant Gupta as Imaad Akbar (Season 3–present)

Recurring
 Amit Sial as Devender Mishra, an off-spinner who dislikes Prashant, and follows the same career path as Arvind. (Season 1–3)
 Manu Rishi as Manoharlal Handa, a rich, eccentric businessman and owner of the Haryana Hurricanes. (Season 1–3)
 Karan Oberoi as Imtiaz Khan, an actor and Zarina's ex-boyfriend. (Season 1–3)
 Flora Saini as Ayesha Dewan, Handa's partner and a power broker. She later becomes owner of the Bangalore Blitzers. (Season 1–present)
 Akashdeep Arora as Tanay, a team analyst for the Mavericks. (Season 1–2)
 Gaurav Sharma as Moses Alexander, Ex India Wicketkeeper and the head coach of the Mavericks after Niranjan Suri. (Season 1–2)
 Vidya Malvade as Tisha Chopra, an ex-India International and bowling coach of the Haryana Hurricanes. (Season 2)
 Sarah-Jane Dias as Meera Nagpal, a journalist and Vayu's ex-girlfriend. (Season 1)
 Luke Kenny as Wolfgang Hummels, an anti-doping official. (Season 2–3)
 Himanshi Choudhry as Sudha Dhawan, Vikrant's wife. (Season 1–present)
 Elli Avram as Sandy, Cheerleader of Mumbai Mavericks and Prashant's girlfriend. (Season 2)
 Alexx O'Nell as Craig Litner, vice-captain of the Mavericks. (Season 1)
 Ogunro Gbolabo Lucas as Dwight Johnson, a fast bowler for the Mavericks. (Season 1–2)
 Aahana Kumra as Shahana Vashishth, Arvind's estranged wife. (Season 1)
 Sanjay Suri as Niranjan Suri, the head coach of the Mavericks. (Season 1)
 Abhishek Banerjee as Drug Dealer. (Season 1)
 Manuj Sharma as K. R. Raghunath,  Wicketkeeper and Opening Batsman of Mavericks. (Season 1)
 Jitin Gulati as Pritish, Vikrant's right hand man later revealed to be Bhaisahab's man. (Season 1–present)
 Chirag Sethi as Anees Iqbal, key batsman cricketer of Mumbai Mavericks, later revealed as a fixer batsman playing under Dhawan. (Season 1)
 Sunny Hinduja as Sultan Ali Khan, Pakistan Cricket Team captain. (Season 3)
 Renuka Shahane as Prime Minister of India (season 3)
 Ankur Vikal as Azeem Khan, Coach (Season 3) 
 Ankur Rathee as Allen Manezes, gay rights lawyer and love of Rohit Shanbagh (season 3)
 Dalip Tahil as Judge Roy (Season 3)
 Prasanna Ketkar as Yashwardhan and Vikrant's father (Season 3)

Episodes

Season 2

Season 3

Reception
The series has received critical acclaim for performance and storyline. The acting performance of Siddhant Chaturvedi, Vivek Oberoi, Tanuj Virvani, Richa Chadha, Sayani Gupta and Angad Bedi has been especially praised. India Today called the series "perfectly cast and technically first rate". The Indian Express praised the performance of all actors saying that "web-series packs interesting punch shouldered by some honest performances" and also stated that the shows quality hasn't been compromised just because web series is a far smaller medium than films. Firstpost positively reviewed the series saying "the characters are so seamlessly integrated into the narrative that it does not feel like a make believe world".

Accolades

References

External links
 Official website
 Official Indian website
 

2010s American LGBT-related drama television series
2017 American television series debuts
2017 Indian television series debuts
Indian drama television series
Indian sports television series
American sports television series
Amazon Prime Video original programming
Indian LGBT-related television shows
Hindi-language television shows
English-language television shows
Cricket on television
Hindi-language web series
Television shows set in Delhi
Television shows set in Mumbai
Bollywood in fiction